Duquette may be a reference to:

People
Duquette (surname), including name origin, plus people with the name

Places
Duquette, Minnesota